The First Things First Foundation is a Christian organization founded by the NFL quarterback Kurt Warner and his wife Brenda in May 2001. The name of the organization was inspired by a dialogue between Warner and the media in the postgame interview after the St. Louis Rams won the Super Bowl in January 2000 and Warner was named the game's MVP:

The foundation pays for a week-long trip to Walt Disney World for dozens of children each year. It also has an annual "punt, pass and kick clinic" for children.

References

External links 
Official First Things First Foundation website

Religious organizations based in the United States